Indra Dassanayake (1943 – September 2019) was a Sri Lankan academic, emeritus professor in Hindi, an internationally acclaimed scholar, and was one of the pioneers in introducing and promoting Hindi-language and North Indian culture in Sri Lanka through educational institutions. On 26 January 2020, she was conferred with the prestigious Padma Shri award which is one of the highest Indian civilian awards coinciding with the 71st Republic Day of India.

Career 
She pursued her higher education at the University of Lucknow and became professionally fluent with the Hindi-language. After returning from India, she introduced the Hindi-language in Sri Lankan education system. She was also a renowned professor of Hindi at the Kelaniya University. She also contributed to re-establish the Department at the Kelaniya University in 1995. She also participated in the first World Hindi Conference in 1975 which was held in Nagpur.

Honours 
In 1983, Indra was awarded the "Saraswathie Award" by the greatest Hindi poetess named Mahadevi Varma at the World Hindi Convention held at New Delhi for the outstanding service rendered to the development of Hindi Language in Sri Lanka and extending the bilateral cultural ties between two countries. 

In 2007, Indra was awarded the prestigious Dr. George Grierson Award by Her Excellency the President of India Mrs Prathibha Patel Pratibha Patil for the distinguished service rendered on the propagation of Hindi Language in Sri Lanka.  This award was given to her for the year 2005 during the World Hindi Conference in New Delhi on 18 December 2007.

In 2018, she was conferred with the "Doctor Of Literature" by the University Kelaniya, Sri Lanka for representing academic symposiums for 50 years, held in different countries and not only engaging in the educational excursions doing language exploration and globally acquiring academic accomplishments but also fully utilising her acquired expertise for the betterment of the entire university system.  

In 2020, on the Republic Day of India, she was honoured with the prestigious Padma Shri award, by the Government of India, for her contribution to North Indian Literature & Education in Hindi.  It was also the first instance where a Sri Lankan was honoured with the prestigious award since 2002.

References 

1941 births
2019 deaths
Sri Lankan educators
Academic staff of the University of Kelaniya
University of Lucknow alumni
Recipients of the Padma Shri in literature & education
Sri Lankan expatriates in India